The Meghna River is one of the major rivers in Bangladesh, one of the three that form the Ganges Delta, the largest delta on earth, which fans out to the Bay of Bengal. A part of the Surma-Meghna River System, Meghna is formed inside Bangladesh in Kishoreganj District above the town of Bhairab Bazar by the joining of the Surma and the Kushiyara, both of which originate in the hilly regions of eastern India as the Barak River. The Meghna meets its major tributary, the Padma, in Chandpur District. Other major tributaries of the Meghna include the Dhaleshwari, the Gumti, and the Feni. The Meghna empties into the Bay of Bengal in Bhola District via four principal mouths, named Tetulia (Ilsha), Shahbazpur, Hatia, and Bamni.

The Meghna is the widest river among those that flow completely inside the boundaries of Bangladesh. At a point near Bhola, Meghna is 13 km wide. In its lower reaches, this river's path is almost perfectly straight.

Course
The Meghna is formed due to the confluence of the Surma and Kushiyara rivers originating from the hilly regions of eastern India. Down to Chandpur, Meghna is hydrographically referred to as the Upper Meghna. After the Padma joins, it is referred to as the Lower Meghna.

Near Muladhuli in Barisal district, the Safipur River is an offshoot of the Surma that creates one of the main rivers in South Bengal. 1.5 km wide, this river is one of the widest in the country as well.

The Titas forms as a single stream but braids into two distinct streams that remain separate before re-joining the Meghna.

In Daudkandi, (Comilla District), the Meghna is joined by the Gumti River, which increases the Meghna's water flow considerably. The pair of bridges over the Meghna and Gumti are two of the country's largest bridges.

Meghna is 
reinforced by the Dhaleshwari before Chandpur. Further down, the Padma River- the largest distributary of the Ganges in Bangladesh, along with the Jamuna River- the largest distributary of the Brahmaputra, join with the Meghna in Chandpur District, resulting in the Lower Meghna.

After Chandpur, the combined flow of the Padma, Jamuna, and Meghna moves down to the Bay of Bengal in an almost straight line, braiding occasionally into a number of riverines including the Pagli, Katalia, Dhonagoda, Matlab, and Udhamodi. All of these rivers rejoin the Meghna at different points downstream.

Near Bhola, just before flowing into the Bay of Bengal, the river again divides into two main streams in the Ganges delta and separates an island from both sides of the mainland. The western stream is called Ilsha while the eastern one is called Bamni. They form the largest delta named Ganges delta.

See also
List of rivers in Bangladesh

References

Rivers of Bangladesh
Bay of Bengal
Distributaries of the Ganges
Ganges basin
Rivers of Chittagong Division